Naujaat Airport, formerly Repulse Bay Airport , is located at Naujaat, Nunavut, Canada, and is operated by the government of Nunavut.

Airlines and destinations

Climate

References

External links

Certified airports in the Kivalliq Region